Nujol is a brand of mineral oil by Plough Inc., cas number 8012-95-1, and density  0.838 g/mL at 25 °C, used in infrared spectroscopy. It is a heavy paraffin oil so it is chemically inert and has a relatively uncomplicated IR spectrum, with major peaks between 2950-2800, 1465-1450, and 1380–1300 cm−1. The empirical formula of Nujol is hard to determine exactly because it is a mixture but it is essentially the alkane formula  where n is very large.

To obtain an IR spectrum of a solid, a sample is combined with Nujol in a mortar and pestle or some other device to make a mull (a very thick suspension), and is usually sandwiched between potassium- or sodium chloride plates before being placed in the spectrometer.  For very reactive samples, the layer of Nujol can provide a protective coating, preventing sample decomposition during acquisition of the IR spectrum.  When preparing the sample it is important to keep the sample from being saturated with Nujol, this will result in erroneous spectra since the Nujol peaks will dominate, silencing the actual sample's peaks.

References

External links
 MSDS data sheet
 Nujol's historic use as an alternative medicine
 CAS Number for Nujol

Hydrocarbon solvents
Infrared spectroscopy
Alkanes